David John Benney (8 April 1930 – 9 October 2015) was a New Zealand applied mathematician, known for work on the nonlinear partial differential equations of fluid dynamics.

Education and early life
Born in Wellington, New Zealand, on 8 April 1930 to Cecil Henry (Matt) Benney and Phyllis Marjorie Jenkins, Benney was educated at Wellington College. He graduated BSc from Victoria University College in 1950, and MSc from the same institution in 1951. He then went to Emmanuel College, Cambridge, from where he graduated BA in the Mathematical Tripos in 1954. He was at Canterbury University College for two years as a lecturer, before taking leave of absence in August 1957 to undertake doctoral studies at Massachusetts Institute of Technology (MIT), graduating PhD in 1959.

Career and research
Benney joined the mathematics faculty at MIT in 1960. He spent the rest of his career there, as a prolific researcher in fluid dynamics and supervisor of students, becoming emeritus professor. He received a Guggenheim Fellowship in 1964.

Notes

References

1930 births
2015 deaths
New Zealand mathematicians
Fluid dynamicists
Victoria University of Wellington alumni
Academic staff of the University of Canterbury
Alumni of Emmanuel College, Cambridge
Massachusetts Institute of Technology School of Science faculty
People from Wellington City
People educated at Wellington College (New Zealand)
Massachusetts Institute of Technology School of Science alumni